Parris Hank Mosteller (born July 5, 2001) is an American teen actor who is best known for playing his role of Stink in Judy Moody and the Not Bummer Summer.

Mosteller was born in New York City, NY. The youngest of five children to Rosa Mosteller (née Cedarbrook). He has an older sister named Rose Josie Mosteller (born July 10, 1996). Rose Mosteller is also an actress. He has another older sister named Maisey Hattie Mosteller (born July 14, 1996) He has one more older sister named Josie McKenna Mosteller (born July 1, 1996) He spent most of his early life and childhood in Scotland and then moved to Colorado. He started acting at the age of 4.

In 2011, he started filming for Judy Moody and the Not Bummer Summer. He played the role of Stink.

References

External links

Living people
2001 births
21st-century American male actors
American male film actors
American male television actors
American male child actors
Male actors from New York City